Robert Francz (born March 30, 1978) is a German ice hockey player.

External links
 

1978 births
Living people
Arizona Coyotes draft picks
Peterborough Petes (ice hockey) players
German ice hockey players
People from Bad Muskau
Sportspeople from Saxony